Mirliton may refer to:
 Mirliton (military), a tall hat worn by hussars and other light cavalrymen in the 18th century
 Chayote, a pear-shaped vegetable or its vine
 Eunuch flute, a musical instrument
 Mirliton, a comic book cat character created by Raymond Macherot and Raoul Cauvin
 Le Mirliton, a Paris cabaret opened in 1885 by Aristide Bruant